Udupiddy American Mission College ( Uṭuppiṭṭi Amerikkaṉ Micaṉ Kallūri) is a national school in Udupiddy, Sri Lanka. It was founded on 4 January 1852 by American Ceylon Mission.

It was started in 1852. In 2021, it became a national school from a provincial school.

Principals 
 Mr. S. K. Rasiah - 1932 to 1938
 Mr. K. T. John - 1939 to 1956
 Mr. S. S. Selvadurai - 1956 to 1971
 Mr. Robert Navaratnam - 1971 to 
 Mr. K. Sithamparappillai
 Mr. V. T. Selvaratnam
 Mr. N. Anantharaj 
 Mr. S. Thilaimpalan
 Mr. K. Nadarajah
 Mr. K. Tharmalingam
 Mr. S.Krishnakumar - 2012 to 2020
 Mr. Puvanenthirarajah - 2021 to 2022
 Mr. Selvavinayakam- 2022

Notable alumni

See also
 List of schools in Northern Province, Sri Lanka

References

American Ceylon Mission schools
Boys' schools in Sri Lanka
Provincial schools in Sri Lanka
Schools in Jaffna District
Buildings and structures in Udupiddy